Wild Horse Phantom is a 1944 American Producers Releasing Corporation Western film of the "Billy the Kid" series directed by Sam Newfield.

Plot
The film begins with a breakout of five inmates from a modern day prison.  Watching the escape with the warden is Billy Carson who has engineered the break. Carson has the idea that he will trail the leader of the escapees, Link Daggett in order to recover the missing money from a bank robbery.  The robbery caused an entire community to lose their savings and face financial ruin. Carson and Fuzzy trail Daggett's gang to the Wild Horse Mine where Daggett may have hidden the loot.  Inside the mine Daggett can not find the money. Billy and Fuzzy have to face not only the gang, but a maniac acting like a ghost as well as a giant bat that had featured in PRC's The Devil Bat.

Cast 
Buster Crabbe as Billy Carson
Falcon as Billy's Horse
Al St. John as Fuzzy Q. Jones
Janet Warren as Marian Garnet
Kermit Maynard as Link Daggett, Gang Leader
Budd Buster as Ed Garnet
Hal Price as Clipp Walters
Robert Meredith as Tom Hanlon
Frank Ellis as Henchman Kallen
Frank McCarroll as Henchman Moffett
John L. Cason as Henchman Lucas
John Elliott as Prison Warden

See also
The "Billy the Kid" films starring Buster Crabbe: 
 Billy the Kid Wanted (1941)
 Billy the Kid's Round-Up (1941)
 Billy the Kid Trapped (1942)
 Billy the Kid's Smoking Guns (1942)
 Law and Order (1942) 
 Sheriff of Sage Valley (1942) 
 The Mysterious Rider (1942)
 The Kid Rides Again (1943)
 Fugitive of the Plains (1943)
 Western Cyclone (1943)
 Cattle Stampede (1943)
 The Renegade (1943)
 Blazing Frontier (1943)
 Devil Riders (1943)
 Frontier Outlaws (1944)
 Valley of Vengeance (1944)
 The Drifter (1944) 
 Fuzzy Settles Down (1944)
 Rustlers' Hideout (1944)
 Wild Horse Phantom (1944)
 Oath of Vengeance (1944)
 His Brother's Ghost (1945) 
 Thundering Gunslingers (1945)
 Shadows of Death (1945)
 Gangster's Den (1945)
 Stagecoach Outlaws (1945)
 Border Badmen (1945)
 Fighting Bill Carson (1945)
 Prairie Rustlers (1945) 
 Lightning Raiders (1945)
 Terrors on Horseback (1946)
 Gentlemen with Guns (1946)
 Ghost of Hidden Valley (1946)
 Prairie Badmen (1946)
 Overland Riders (1946)
 Outlaws of the Plains (1946)

External links 

1944 films
1940s Western (genre) comedy films
1940s English-language films
American black-and-white films
Billy the Kid (film series)
Films directed by Sam Newfield
Producers Releasing Corporation films
American Western (genre) comedy films
1944 comedy films
1940s American films